Hirannaiah or Hirannayya, known by his stage name Master Hirannaiah (15 February 1934 – 2 May 2019), was an Indian actor in the Kannada film industry and a theatre artist in Karnataka, India. His films include ...Re (2016), Care of Footpath 2 (2015),  No. 73, Shanthi Nivasa (2007).

Early life
Hirannaiah was born in Mysore, Karnataka on 15 February 1934. His father K. Hirannaiah too was an Indian actor, director, and writer in the Kannada film industry and a theatre artist in the state. His mother was Sharadamma. After finishing primary education in Banumayya Middle school, Hirannaiah completed intermediate in Sharada Vilas, Mysore, Karnataka. In his childhood days, he distributed newspaper Sadhvi to fund his education, while actively participating in drama and theatre plays.

After his father's death, Hirannaiah took over the management of the K.Hirannaiah Mitra Mandali, which was founded by his late father. Later he became actor, director and administrator of the theatre company.

Career
Master Hirannaiah was part of more than 30 movies in Kannada. His notable drama plays include Lanchavathara, Double Thaali, Kanya Dahana,  Sanyasi Samsara, Chamachavathara, Haasyadalli Ulta Palta, Kapi Mushti, Nadubidi Narayana, Bhrashtachaara, Anaachaara, with Lanchavathara playing more than 11 thousand times, over a span of 45 years, performing in countries like United States, Australia, Singapore, and England.

Hirannaiah Award 
Master Hirannaiah established the Hirannaiah Award, in memory of his father who was known popularly as "cultural comedian" or "cultured comedian". Hirannaiah Awards are presented on behalf of Karnataka Nataka Academy, to theatre artists (native name: Rangamukhagalu) for their notable drama works. First award ceremony was held on 17 April 2010, at the Jaganmohan Palace auditorium in Mysore, Karnataka.

Death 
Hirannaiah died on 2 May 2019 at a hospital in Bengaluru, Karnataka of complications from liver disease, aged 85.

Awards won
 Rajyotsava Prashasti
 Gubbi Veeranna Award (1988)
 Sangeet Natak Akademi Award
 Sandesha Arts Award (2009)
 18th Anakru Nirman Swarna Award (2013)
 Maha Advaithi Award (2017)
 Alva's Nudisiri Award (2005)

Selected filmography
 Yaksha (2010)
 Niranthara (2010)
 Ee Sambhashane (2009)
 Lancha Samrajya (2007)
 Bombugalu Saar Bombugalu (2007)
 Gaja (2008)
 Hudgeeru Saar Hudgeeru (2005)
 Operation Antha (1995)

See also

List of people from Karnataka
Cinema of Karnataka
List of Indian film actors
Cinema of India

References

External links

1934 births
Male actors in Kannada cinema
Indian male film actors
Male actors from Karnataka
20th-century Indian male actors
21st-century Indian male actors
Male actors in Kannada theatre
2019 deaths
Deaths from liver disease